John W. Randolph was a state legislator in Mississippi. He represented Sunflower County and Leflore County in the Mississippi House of Representatives 1874 and 1875. He was appointed to be circuit and chancery clerk in Sunflower County in 1875. He attended Republican political conventions,  into the early 1900s.

He was appointed to succeed G. W. Bowles on the chancery court.

See also
 African-American officeholders during and following the Reconstruction era

References

Year of birth missing
African-American men in politics
African-American politicians during the Reconstruction Era
People from Sunflower County, Mississippi
African-American state legislators in Mississippi
Mississippi Republicans